The Second Coming of Christ  is a posthumously published non-fiction book by the Indian yogi and guru Paramahansa Yogananda (1893–1952). With commentary on passages from the four Gospels. The full title of the two-volume work is The Second Coming of Christ: The Resurrection of the Christ Within You—A revelatory commentary on the original teachings of Jesus.

Description
The book tells the story of Jesus Christ’s life in chronological order. His birth, his travels, his ministry, his parables, his death, and his resurrection. Yogananda discusses a link between Kriya Yoga and the teachings of Jesus.

Emergence 
Yogananda left India in 1920 for America and gave his first speech at the Congress of Religious Liberals. He stayed in America until his death in 1952. During this time he gave more than 150 talks  and wrote numerous articles, many about the Christian Gospels. 

Yogananda also announced that he would be giving weekly classes in Boston that would consist of a half-hour exposition of the Bhagavad Gita, a half-hour exposition of the Gospels, followed by a half-hour discourse demonstrating their fundamental unity. After establishing a magazine, he began publishing a series of articles on the Gita and another series on the Gospels, which latter even then he called The Second Coming of Christ. Then, during his last four years, he withdrew into seclusion to work on his writings. Yogananda wanted them collected and printed in a book, but found that a tremendous amount of editing was needed. When he died, he left an extensive body of work—public lectures and classes that had been recorded stenographically by Sri Daya Mata, along with three decades of his original writing. The editors, to whom he had conveyed his wishes for this vast volume of material, compiled and integrated it into The Second Coming of Christ.

Editions 
In 1979 the Amrita Foundation of Dallas, Texas printed a three-volume set of the magazine articles that had been edited.
2004 Self-Realization Fellowship published a two-volume edition of The Second Coming of Christ, that had been greatly augmented by the addition of much material on the Gospels that had been gathered from many of the Master’s other talks and writings. It was compiled and edited by Mrinalini Mata, the past President of SRF.

Translations
The original SRF book in English has two volumes. It was translated into the following languages (As of November 2018):
 Three volumes in Spanish.
 Three volumes in German two have already been published.
 Three volumes in Portuguese.

The book The Yoga of Jesus is a 147-page abridgement of the two volumes, and is available in English, German, Italian, Finnish, Polish, Thai, Portuguese and Spanish.

Reception
Larry Dossey, M.D., wrote that "Paramahansa Yogananda’s The Second Coming of Christ is one of the most important analyses of Jesus’ teachings that exists (...) Many interpretations of Jesus’ words divide peoples, cultures, and nations; these foster unity and healing, and that is why they are vital for today’s world."

Teresa Watanabe of the Los Angeles Times wrote, "'The Second Coming of Christ: The Resurrection of Christ Within You,' offers startling ideas about the deeper meaning of Jesus' teachings and their essential unity with yoga, one of the world's oldest and most systematic religious paths to achieving oneness with God."

Awards 
 Winner, Best spiritual/ religious book, spanish– 2012, 2013 and 2014 International Latino Book Awards.

See also
 God Talks with Arjuna: The Bhagavad Gita

References

Sources
 Sri Daya Mata, Sri Mrinalini Mata : The Second Coming of Christ Making of a Scripture - Reminiscences by Sri Daya Mata and Sri Mrinalini Mata, Self-Realization Fellowship, .

External links
 Excerpts from the book yogananda-srf.org
 Excerpts from the book yogananda-srf.org
 Facebook page for this book  
 Review of the Second Coming of Christ by Sarvajnapeetha youtube.com

Paramahansa Yogananda
2004 non-fiction books
Books about spirituality
Books about Jesus
Classic yoga books
Books published posthumously